Dominic Carmen Frontiere (June 17, 1931 – December 21, 2017) was an American composer, arranger, and jazz accordionist.  He composed the theme and much of the music for the first season of the television series The Outer Limits, as well as the theme song for The Rat Patrol.

Biography

Early years
Born in New Haven, Connecticut, the son of a musical family, at age seven Frontiere was already playing several instruments before deciding to concentrate on the accordion. At age twelve, he played a solo recital at Carnegie Hall.

Hollywood
After a period with The Horace Heidt Orchestra in the late 1940s and early 1950s, Frontiere moved to Los Angeles, where he enrolled at University of California, Los Angeles. He eventually became musical director at 20th Century Fox. He scored several films under the tutelage of Alfred and Lionel Newman, while also recording jazz music. He composed the music for two exotica LP records Pagan Festival (1959) and Love Eyes, The Mood of Romance (1960).

An association with director and producer Leslie Stevens began with Frontiere scoring The Marriage-Go-Round (1961). This association led to several projects, such as his innovative blend of music and sound effects for The Outer Limits. He composed several famous television themes of the 1960s, such as those for The Rat Patrol, Branded, The Flying Nun, and for producer Quinn Martin The Invaders, The Fugitive, and 12 O'Clock High.

After scoring for television shows, he went on to compose the music for the Clint Eastwood film Hang 'Em High. The title theme for that movie became a top-10 hit for the group Booker T. & the M.G.'s. He also composed the soundtrack to the 1971 motorcycle documentary On Any Sunday, which featured Steve McQueen and was directed by Bruce Brown. He composed the scores of three films starring John Wayne, Chisum (1970), The Train Robbers (1973) and Brannigan (1975).

Frontiere became head of the music department at Paramount Pictures in the early 1970s, where he again worked on television and film scores, while concurrently orchestrating popular music albums for, among others, Chicago. Examples of Frontiere's sweeping, cinematic orchestrations appear in the opening and closing songs of the 1977 album Nether Lands by Dan Fogelberg. He won a Golden Globe Awards for the score to the 1980 film The Stunt Man. He also composed a jingle for the studio's television division. Frontiere composed a theme for the lion Togar that was featured in the film Roar. Stunt Man director Richard Rush's son Tony Rush served as camera assistant on Roar.

Tax evasion conviction
In 1986, Frontiere was incarcerated for nine months in a federal penitentiary after scalping tickets to the 1980 Super Bowl, which he obtained through his then-wife, Los Angeles Rams owner Georgia Frontiere. He was estimated to have scalped as many as 16,000 tickets, making a half million dollars in profit that he did not report to the Internal Revenue Service. Frontiere pleaded guilty and was sentenced to a year and one day in prison, three years probation, and fined $15,000 for failing to report income from the sale of the tickets and for lying to the IRS.  Georgia Frontiere filed for divorce shortly after Dominic's release from prison.

Death
Frontiere died on 21 December 2017, at the age of 86 in Tesuque, New Mexico, where he lived.

Selected works

Television
 1961: The New Breed
 1962: Stoney Burke
 1963: The Outer Limits (first season only)
 1964: 12 O'Clock High
 1965: Branded
 1966: The Rat Patrol
 1966: Iron Horse
 1967: The Invaders
 1967: The Fugitive
 1967: The Flying Nun
 1970: The Immortal
 1970: The Silent Force
 1970: Swing Out, Sweet Land (TV special)
 1972: Search
 1974: Chopper One
 1974: Movin' On
 1977: Washington: Behind Closed Doors
 1978: Perfect Gentlemen
 1978: Vega$
 1981: Strike Force
 1982: Don't Go to Sleep
 1982: Matt Houston

Film
 1960: One Foot in Hell
 1961: The Marriage-Go-Round
 1965: Billie
 1966: Incubus
 1968: Hang 'Em High
 1969: Popi
 1969: Number One
 1970: Chisum
 1971: On Any Sunday
 1972: Hammersmith Is Out
 1973: The Train Robbers
 1973: A Name for Evil
 1974: Freebie and the Bean
 1975  Cleopatra Jones and the Casino of Gold
 1975: Brannigan
 1976: The Gumball Rally
 1980: Defiance
 1980: The Stunt Man
 1981: Roar (credited as the composer of "Togar's Theme")
 1981: Modern Problems
 1985: The Aviator
 1994: Color of Night

References

External links
 
 
 

1931 births
2017 deaths
American people of French-Canadian descent
American film score composers
American male film score composers
American television composers
Male television composers
American music arrangers
American accordionists
American jazz accordionists
American male jazz musicians
Musicians from New Haven, Connecticut
Jazz musicians from California
American people convicted of tax crimes
People from Tesuque, New Mexico
Jazz musicians from Connecticut
Varèse Sarabande Records artists
Golden Globe Award-winning musicians
La-La Land Records artists